Bill Franklin (22 April 1884 – 10 May 1968) was an Australian rules footballer who played with Fitzroy in the Victorian Football League (VFL).

Notes

External links 
		

1884 births
1968 deaths
Australian rules footballers from Western Australia
Fitzroy Football Club players
Prahran Football Club players